Sir Moyses Hill (often written as Sir Moses Hill) was an English army officer who served in Ireland and later settled in Ireland. He was the governor of Olderfleet Castle, mareschal of Carrickfergus, provost mareschal of Ulster, and represented County Antrim in the Irish parliament of 1613.

Moyses arrived in Ireland in 1573 as part of the Earl of Essex, Walter Devereux's army to subdue or colonize Ulster.

He was appointed the governor of Olderfleet Castle and knighted in 1603. In 1611, he was given possession of the village of Cromlin (now Hillsborough). The position of Provost Mareschal of the Province of Ulster was created for him in 1617. He was granted 2,000 acres in County Antrim and 40,000 acres in County Down for his services to the Crown.

He died in February 1629–30.

Family
He married, firstly, Alice MacDonnell, sister of Sorley Boy MacDonnell, daughter of Alexander MacDonnell, Lord of Islay and Kintyre, and Catherine MacDonald. Their children were:
 Mary Hill, married Sir James Craige of Carrickfergus.
 Penelope Hill, married firstly Arthur Wilmot, son of Charles Wilmot, 1st Viscount Wilmot; secondly Sir William Brooke, and had issue, including the celebrated beauty Margaret, Lady Denham and Hon. Frances Brooke; and thirdly Hon. Edward Russell, and had further issue, including the leading Whig statesman Edward Russell, 1st Earl of Orford. Penelope died in July 1694
 Frances Hill, married Colonel Thomas Coote.
 Peter Hill (died 1644)

He married, secondly, Anne Grogan and had issue:
 Arthur Hill (died April 1663)

References

External links
Hill Surname Origins & Heraldry

16th-century English people
17th-century English people
People from County Antrim
People of Elizabethan Ireland
English emigrants to Ireland
English knights
Irish knights
Year of birth missing
1630 deaths
Moyses
Irish MPs 1613–1615
Members of the Parliament of Ireland (pre-1801) for County Antrim constituencies